Wigand may refer to:

Given name
Saint Wigand, three people:
 Venantius of Berri, 5th century
 Venantius of Camerino, 3rd century
 Venantius of Salona, 3rd century
Wigand of Herford, author of a biography of Saint Waltger
Wigand Siebel, German sociologist
Wigand Wirt, German theologian
Wigand of Marburg, German herald of the Teutonic Knights in Prussia

Surname
Johann Wigand (ca. 1523-1587), German Lutheran cleric and theologian, and Bishop of Pomesania
Albert Julius Wilhelm Wigand (1821–1886), German botanist and opponent of Darwin's theory of evolution
Jeffrey Wigand, former vice president of research and development at Brown & Williamson
Justus Heinrich Wigand, German obstetrician

Other
Wigand (album), album by the German band Adorned Brood

See also
Weigand
Wiegand
Weygand

Surnames from given names